A hydroxyanthraquinone (formula: C14H7O2(OH)) is any of several organic compounds that can be viewed as derivatives of an anthraquinone through replacement of one hydrogen atom (H) by a hydroxyl group (-OH). 
The IUPAC nomenclature recommends hydroxyanthracenedione.

Usually "hydroxyanthraquinone" refers to a derivative of 9,10-anthraquinone.

Isomers
In this case, the number n (which is between 1 and 8) is indicated by a multiplier prefix (mono-, di-, tri-, up to octa-). Additional hydroxy- compounds can be derived from the other isomers of the latter. From 9,10-anthraquinone, only two single-hydroxy derivatives are possible.

See also
Hydroxybenzoquinone
Hydroxynaphthoquinone

References

Hydroxyanthraquinones